
Philip Arthur Fisher (September 8, 1907 – March 11, 2004) was an American stock investor best known as the author of Common Stocks and Uncommon Profits, a guide to investing that has remained in print since it was first published in 1958. Along with Thomas Rowe Price, Jr., Fisher is one of the early proponents of the growth investing strategy.

Career
Philip Fisher's career began in 1928 when he dropped out of the newly created Stanford Graduate School of Business (later he would return to be one of only three people ever to teach the investment course) to work as a securities analyst with the Anglo-London Bank in San Francisco. He switched to a stock exchange firm for a short time before starting his own money management company, Fisher & Co., founded in 1931. He managed the company's affairs until his retirement in 1999 at the age of 91, and is reported to have made his clients extraordinary investment gains.

Although he began some fifty years before the name Silicon Valley became known, he specialized in innovative companies driven by research and development. He practiced long-term investing, and strove to buy great companies at reasonable prices. He was a very private person, giving few interviews, and was very selective about the clients he took on. He was not well known to the public until he published his first book in 1958. At this point Fisher's popularity rose dramatically and propelled him to his now legendary status as a pioneer in the field of growth investing. Morningstar has called him "one of the great investors of all time". In Common Stocks and Uncommon Profits, Fisher said that the best time to sell a stock was "almost never". His most famous investment was his purchase of Motorola, a company he bought in 1955 when it was a radio manufacturer, and held it until his death.  Phillip is remembered for using and proliferating the "scuttlebutt" or "grape vine" tool, in which he searched fastidiously for information about a company.   When you scuttlebutt, you make more informed decisions due a better basis for analysis and valuation.

In the 2018 Berkshire Hathaway annual shareholders meeting, Warren Buffett called Fisher's "Common stocks and uncommon profits" a "very very good book". He further described how using Fisher's "scuttlebutt" technique continues to be a good way to investing, which is still used by Ted Weschler and Todd Combs at Berkshire Hathaway. John Train described Warren Buffett as 85% influenced by Benjamin Graham and 15% by Philip Fisher.

His son Kenneth L. Fisher also founded an investment firm.

Works
 Paths to Wealth through Common Stocks, Prentice-Hall, Inc., 1960
 Conservative Investors Sleep Well,  Harper & Row, 1975
 Developing an Investment Philosophy (Monograph), The Financial Analysts Research Foundation, 1980
 Common Stocks and Uncommon Profits,  Harper & Brothers; Revised edition (December 1960)

See also
 Thomas Rowe Price, Jr.
 John Burr Williams
 Growth investing

References

External links

Fisher obituary by his son Kenneth L. Fisher at Forbes.com
Fisher obituary at Fool.com
Learning from the Long Men, National Review Online

1907 births
2004 deaths
American finance and investment writers
American stock traders
American money managers
American financial analysts
American investors
American financiers